The Washington Street Public Boat Landing Facility (originally the Naval Shore Station) is a landmark in Seattle's Pioneer Square district, in the U.S. state of Washington.

Located south of the Washington State Ferry Terminal, the site features a pergola built for the Seattle Harbor Department in 1920. The structure is listed on the National Register of Historic Places.

See also
 National Register of Historic Places listings in Seattle

References

External links

 Washington Street Boat Landing Pergola Restoration at Seattle.gov

Buildings and structures in Seattle
National Register of Historic Places in Seattle
Pioneer Square, Seattle